Classic Campbell is a 3 disc compilation album issued by EMI in 2006, consisting of hit singles, album tracks and a few previously unreleased recordings (that first surfaced on the 1995 The Essential Glen Campbell Volume One, Two and Three series) from the sixties and the seventies. One album track makes its CD debut here, the instrumental "Wimoweh (The Lion Sleeps Tonight)", from The Astounding 12-String Guitar of Glen Campbell (1963).

Track listing
Disc 1:

 "I Walk The Line" (John R. Cash)
 "God Only Knows" (Tony Asher, Brian Wilson)
 "By The Time I Get To Phoenix" (Jimmy Webb)
 "It's Only Make Believe" (Conway Twitty, Jack Nance)
 "Bridge Over Troubled Water" (Paul Simon)
 "Your Cheatin' Heart" (Hank Williams)
 "Homeward Bound" (Paul Simon)
 "Gentle on My Mind" (John Hartford)
 "(Sittin' On) The Dock of the Bay" (Steve Cropper, Otis Redding)
 "Both Sides Now" (Joni Mitchell)
 "All the Way" (Sammy Cahn, Jimmy Van Heusen)
 "Only the Lonely" (Joe Melson, Roy Orbison)
 "Annie's Song " (live) (John Denver)
 "Oh, Boy!" (Sonny West, Norman Petty, Bill Tilghman)
 "You'll Never Walk Alone" (Richard Rodgers, Oscar Hammerstein II)
 "The Twelfth of Never" (Paul Francis Webster, Jerry Livingston)
 "The Impossible Dream" (Mitch Leigh, Joe Darion)
 "Highwayman" (Jimmy Webb)
 "True Grit" (Don Black, Elmer Bernstein)
 "My Way" (Claude François, Jacques Revaux, Gillis Thibaut, Paul Anka)

Disc 2:

 "Learnin' the Blues" (Dolores Vicki Silvers)
 "Rhinestone Cowboy" (Larry Weiss)
 "Wichita Lineman" (Jimmy Webb)
 "Break My Mind" (John D. Loudermilk)
 "Dream Baby (How Long Must I Dream)" (Cindy Walker)
 "Southern Nights" (Allen Toussaint)
 "Until It's Time for You to Go" (Buffy Saint-Marie)
 "Universal Soldier" (Buffy Saint-Marie)
 "Galveston" (Jimmy Webb)
 "It's Over" (Roy Orbison, Bill Dees)
 "Help Me Make It Through the Night" (Kris Kristofferson)
 "Mary in the Morning" (Johnny Cymbal, Mike Lendell)
 "Crying" (Roy Orbison, Joe Melson)
 "Running Scared" (Joe Melson, Roy Orbison)
 "The Last Thing on My Mind" (Tom Paxton)
 "Yesterday When I Was Young" (Charles Aznavour, Herbert Kretzmer)
 "My Girl" (Ronald White, Smokey Robinson)
 "Catch The Wind" (Donovan Phillips Leitch)
 "Without Her" (Harry Nilsson)
 "You're My World" (Umberto Bindi, Carl Sigman, Gino Paoli)

Disc 3:

 "Tomorrow Never Comes" (Ernest Tubb, Johnny Bond)
 "He Ain't Heavy, He's My Brother" (Bob Russell, Bob Scott)
 "All I Have to Do Is Dream" (with Bobbie Gentry) (Boudleaux Bryant, Felice Bryant)
 "Blowin' in the Wind" (Instrumental) (Bob Dylan)
 "Elusive Butterfly" (Bob Lind)
 "Everything a Man Could Ever Need" (Mac Davis)
 "Country Boy (You Got Your Feet in L.A.)" (Dennis Lambert, Brian Potter)
 "Somethin' 'Bout You Baby I Like" (with Rita Coolidge) (Richard Supa)
 "Honey Come Back" (Jimmy Webb)
 "Classical Gas" (instrumental) (Mason Williams)
 "Mr. Tambourine Man" (instrumental) (Bob Dylan)
 "I Never Promised You) a Rose Garden" (Joe South)
 "Wimoweh (The Lion Sleeps Tonight)" (instrumental) (Paul Campbell)
 "King of the Road" (instrumental) (Roger Miller)
 "Little Green Apples" (with Bobbie Gentry) (Bobby Russell)
 "I'm So Lonesome I Could Cry" (Hank Williams)
 "If Not For You" (Bob Dylan)
 "Reason to Believe" (Tim Hardin)
 "Take These Chains from My Heart" (Fred Rose, Hy Heath)
 "Cold, Cold Heart" (Hank Williams)

Charts
Album - Billboard (United States)

Classic Campbell did not chart.

2006 compilation albums
Glen Campbell compilation albums
EMI Records compilation albums